In algebraic geometry, the Atiyah–Bott formula says the cohomology ring

of the moduli stack of principal bundles is a free graded-commutative algebra on certain homogeneous generators.

See also 
Borel's theorem, which says that the cohomology ring of a classifying stack is a polynomial ring.

Notes

References 
 
 

Theorems in algebraic geometry